Undisputed Queen is the third studio album by soul singer, Peggy Scott-Adams. The album included the singles, "That's How I Do It" "Mommy's No Dummy" "It Ain't All Good" "When You're Married To a Fool" and "You Will Always Be My Man."

Track listing
 "That's How I Do It"
 "Let The Door It Ya!"
 "That's OK With Me"
 "It Ain't All Good"
 "Mommy's No Dummy"
 "When You're Married To a Fool"
 "You Will Always Be My Man"
 "Be Careful In The Name of Love"
 "You're Too Freaky for Me"
 "I'm Willing To Be Your Friend"

References

1999 albums
Peggy Scott-Adams albums